"Green Is the Colour" is a track on Pink Floyd's 1969 More. It was composed and written by Roger Waters and sung by David Gilmour. A tin whistle is heard in the song, played by drummer Nick Mason's then-wife Lindy. A live version of the song was released as the third single to promote The Early Years 1965–1972 box set in October 2016.

Live 

Live arrangements of the song were performed as a full electric band piece and at a slower tempo. Richard Wright played organ sound throughout, which segued into the piece that always immediately followed it, "Careful with That Axe, Eugene". David Gilmour also sang a scat vocal over his guitar solo during the outro (which he would do later in the song "Wish You Were Here"). In a live intro to the song from 1970, Roger Waters states that the song is "about being on Ibiza" the setting of the film, More.

In The Man and The Journey suite, the song was retitled "The Beginning" in "The Journey" half of the show. It was played as a medley with "Beset by the Creatures of the Deep", which was a retitling of "Careful with That Axe, Eugene".

The song was a regular part of the band's shows from early 1969 through 1970, then less common in 1971. It was played for the last time during their short tour of Japan and Australia in August 1971. The song was later played by Nick Mason's Saucerful of Secrets.

Personnel
Studio recording
David Gilmour – lead vocals, acoustic guitars
Richard Wright – piano, Farfisa organ
Roger Waters – bass guitar
with:

Lindy Mason – tin whistle

Live performances
 David Gilmour - electric guitar, lead vocals
 Richard Wright - Farfisa organ
 Roger Waters - bass guitar
 Nick Mason - drums

Nick Mason's Saucerful of Secrets
 Nick Mason - drums
 Gary Kemp - electric guitar, lead vocals
 Lee Harris - acoustic guitar
 Guy Pratt - bass guitar, backing vocals
 Dom Beken - piano, backing vocals

References

1969 songs
Pink Floyd songs
Folk ballads
Psychedelic songs
Songs written by Roger Waters
Song recordings produced by David Gilmour
Song recordings produced by Roger Waters
Song recordings produced by Richard Wright (musician)
Song recordings produced by Nick Mason